McKaskle v. Wiggins, 465 U.S. 168 (1984), is a United States Supreme Court case in which the court  considered the role of  standby counsel in a criminal trial where the defendant conducted his own defense (pro se).  In this case the defendant claimed his Sixth Amendment right to present his own case in a criminal trial was violated by the presence of a court-appointed standby counsel.

Circumstances
Carl Edwin Wiggins was on trial for robbery and chose to proceed pro se and was convicted and sentenced to life imprisonment. The conviction was overturned on the technicality, that the indictment was defective and Wiggins requested counsel for the second trial. The trial court appointed standby counsel to assist him if requested. Wiggins decided to defend himself and asked that the standby  counsel be barred from interfering. Multiple times, both before and during the trial, Wiggins changed his mind regarding the standby counsel's role. Wiggins sometimes allowed or even requested standby counsels' participation. He was once again convicted. After his conviction, Wiggins moved for a new trial on the grounds that his standby counsel had  interfered with his presentation of his own defense. This motion was denied by the trial court.

Appeals
When Wiggins had exhausted both direct appellate and state habeas corpus, he filed a habeas petition in Federal District Court, claiming that standby counsel's conduct deprived him of his constitutional right to conduct his own defense as  guaranteed in Faretta v. California (1975). The federal court agreed that counsel should not interfere without permission but found that Wiggins' attorneys had not interfered  and the appeal was dismissed.
Upon appeal the Court of Appeals reversed, holding that Wiggins' Sixth Amendment right to represent himself was violated by the  intrusive participation of the court-appointed  standby counsel.

Decision
In a split 6–3 decision, the court found that Wiggins' right to present his own defense was not violated, since "it appears that he was allowed to make his own appearances as he saw fit and that his standby counsel's unsolicited involvement was held within reasonable limits." Judge Sandra Day O'Connor delivered the opinion of the Court, in which Chief Justice Burger, Powell, Rehnquist, and Stevens joined. Blackmun concurred in the result. White filed a dissenting opinion, in which Brennan and Marshall joined.

The decision was based on federal and state laws preserving a defendant's right to self-representation as guaranteed in Faretta. Self-representation  includes certain specific rights for a defendant to have his opinion heard. "The pro se defendant must be allowed to control the organization and content of his own defense, to make motions, to argue points of law, to participate in voir dire, to question witnesses, and to address the court and the jury at appropriate points in the trial. The record reveals that Wiggins was in fact accorded all of these rights."

Significance
This case set a precedent for the boundaries on the behavior of standby counsel by refining the position taken in Faretta v. California regarding standby counsels' role.

See also
List of United States Supreme Court cases, volume 465

References

Further reading

External links
 

United States Supreme Court cases
United States Supreme Court cases of the Burger Court
United States Sixth Amendment self-representation case law
1984 in United States case law
Legal history of Texas